Digimon Universe: App Monsters is a Japanese anime and seventh incarnation of the Digimon franchise. The anime adaptation of the series began airing on all TXN stations in Japan on October 1, 2016, replacing Time Travel Girl on its original timeslot. The series opening theme from episodes 1 to 25 is "DiVE" by Amatsuki and from episodes 26 to 52, "Gatchen!" by SymaG.


Episode list

References

Digimon Universe: App Monsters
2016 Japanese television seasons
2017 Japanese television seasons
Appli Monsters